Living in Oz is the seventh studio album released by rock musician Rick Springfield by RCA Records in 1983.  The album was quickly certified Platinum in America.

In 1984, Springfield was nominated for a Grammy Award for Best Male Rock Vocal Performance for the "Affair of the Heart" single, which peaked at number nine on the Billboard Hot 100 and #10 on the Cash Box Top 100.

The album's title is an allusion to living in Australia (Oz = Australia).

Track listing
All songs written by Rick Springfield, except "Affair of the Heart", co-written with Danny Tate and Blaise Tosti.
"Human Touch" -5:08
"Alyson" -3:49
"Affair of the Heart" -4:33
"Living in Oz" -3:49
"Me & Johnny" -4:26
"Motel Eyes" -3:12
"Tiger by the Tail" -3:25
"Souls" -4:15
"I Can't Stop Hurting You" -3:44
"Like Father, Like Son" -2:57

Personnel
Rick Springfield - lead vocals, guitar, bass, backing vocals
Tim Pierce - guitar
Mike Seifrit, Dennis Belfield - bass
Brett Tuggle, Alan Pasqua, Gabriel Katona, John Philip Shenale, Mitchell Froom - keyboards
Mike Baird - drums
Jack White - electronic drums
Richard Elliot - saxophone solo on "Human Touch"
Michael Fisher - percussion
Richard Page, Tom Kelly - backing vocals
String arrangements on "Like Father, Like Son": Tom Scott (also the conductor), Rick Springfield, John Philip Shenale
Engineered by Bill Drescher at Sound City
Mastered by Greg Fulginiti at Artisan Sound Recorders

Charts

Certifications

References 

1983 albums
Rick Springfield albums
RCA Records albums